Brodie Orth is an American rugby union player for the Denver Stampede in PRO Rugby. His position is Lock. His previous clubs include Northland RFC (Missouri, USA), Kansas City Blues and Tawa RFC. He is the uncle of Boston Orth.

References

External links
Profile at USA Rugby

1985 births
American rugby union players
Denver Stampede players
Kansas City Blues Rugby players
Living people
Place of birth missing (living people)
United States international rugby union players
Rugby union locks